(While Two Dispute, the Third Enjoys) is a dramma giocoso in two acts by Giuseppe Sarti. The libretto was after Carlo Goldoni's Le nozze (The Marriage).

One aria from this opera, "Come un agnello", is famously quoted by Mozart at the end of Don Giovanni.

Performance history
It was first performed at the Teatro alla Scala in Milan on 14 September 1782. It became very successful, being produced under different names, in different languages, and in numerous European cities. For instance, it was performed as Le nozze di Dorina, with inserted arias by Giovanni Battista Viotti, for the opening of the Théâtre de Monsieur in Paris on 6 January 1791. The work also used music composed by Pasquale Anfossi, Antonio Salieri, and Stephen Storace in addition to the composer himself.

Roles

Synopsis
The opera has a story similar to Mozart's Le nozze di Figaro (1786) involving complex intrigues between a pair of jealous, quarrelling aristocrats and their servants.

Notes

Further reading
Fra i due litiganti il terzo gode by John Platoff, in The New Grove Dictionary of Opera, ed. Stanley Sadie (London, 1992)

External links
 
 Work details operamanager.com (in Italian)
 Italian libretto

Operas
Italian-language operas
Drammi giocosi
Operas by Giuseppe Sarti
1782 operas
Operas based on plays
Opera world premieres at La Scala